James Moore (born 20 December 1987) is an English footballer who plays as a defender for Charlotte Eagles in the USL Pro.

Career

College & Amateur
Moore played two years of college soccer at the University of the Cumberlands and two years at the University of West Florida.

Professional career
Moore signed his first professional contract in 2013, signing for USL Pro club Charlotte Eagles.

References

1987 births
Living people
Footballers from Manchester
English footballers
English expatriate footballers
Charlotte Eagles players
Expatriate soccer players in the United States
USL Championship players
Association football defenders
English expatriate sportspeople in the United States
West Florida Argonauts men's soccer players
Chattanooga FC players
Cumberlands Patriots athletes